John F. Ryan IV (born November 30, 1970 in Boston, Massachusetts) is an American alternative comics creator, writer, and animator. He created Angry Youth Comix, a comic book published by Fantagraphics, and "Blecky Yuckerella", a comic strip which originated in the alternative newspaper the Portland Mercury and now appears on Ryan's website. He also created Pig Goat Banana Cricket, a TV show made jointly with Dave Cooper that Nickelodeon picked up. He was the story editor for Looney Tunes Cartoons. In a throwback to the days of underground comix, Ryan's oeuvre is generally an attempt to be as shocking and politically incorrect as possible.

Personal life
Ryan grew up in Boston, and studied English literature at the University of Massachusetts Amherst. Ryan lives in Los Angeles. He is divorced and has one daughter.

Career
Ryan originally self-published Angry Youth Comix, producing eleven mini-comic issues from 1994 to 1998. In 1998, he began showing his work to Peter Bagge, creator of Hate comics, who introduced the material to Eric Reynolds of Fantagraphics. In 2001, Fantagraphics began publishing volume 2 of the series.

Collaborating with Dave Cooper under the pen name "Hector Mumbly", Ryan's comics appeared in nearly every issue of Nickelodeon Magazine. Cooper and Ryan also collaborated on a "Wonder Woman vs. Supergirl" story for the DC Comics anthology Bizarro. Ryan collaborated with Peter Bagge in both Angry Youth Comix and Bagge's Hate Annual, in addition to penciling and inking two stories for Bagge's DC series Sweatshop. In 2006, Ryan guest-edited a special comics issue of Vice magazine, which included contributions from over thirty of Ryan's comics contemporaries.

Ryan's illustrations have appeared in MAD, LA Weekly, National Geographic Kids, Hustler Magazine, The Stranger, and elsewhere. Ryan has also done work for clients such as Nobleworks greetings cards, Rhino Records, and Fox TV. His comics have been translated into Spanish, Portuguese, and French.

Awards
Angry Youth Comix was nominated for a Best Mini Ignatz Award at the 2000 Small Press Expo. It has since been nominated for multiple Harvey and Eisner Awards.
"Prison Pit" won an award for "Best Lettering" at the Stumptown small press festival in Portland, OR in April 2011.

Bibliography and filmography
 Portajohnny: The Best of Angry Youth Comix: The Early Years (Fantagraphics, 2003) 
 What're You Lookin' At?: Volume I of the Collected Angry Youth Comix (Fantagraphics, 2004) 
 Blecky Yuckerella (Fantagraphics, 2005) 
 The Comic Book Holocaust (Buenaventura Press, 2006) 
 Johnny Ryan's XXX Scumbag Party: Volume II of the Collected Angry Youth Comix (Fantagraphics, 2007) 
 The Klassic Komics Klub (Buenaventura Press, 2007) 
 Blecky Yuckerella: Back in Bleck (Fantagraphics, 2007)  
 Comics Are For Idiots (Fantagraphics, 2009)  — Blecky Yuckerella collection
 Prison Pit: Book One (Fantagraphics, 2009) 
 Prison Pit: Book Two (Fantagraphics, 2010) 
 Prison Pit: Book Three (Fantagraphics, 2011) 
 Prison Pit: Book Four (Fantagraphics, 2012) 
 Prison Pit: Book Five (Fantagraphics, 2014) 
 Prison Pit: Book Six (Fantagraphics, 2018) 
 Prison Pit: The Complete Collection (Fantagraphics, 2020) 
 New Character Parade (Pigeon Press, 2010) 
 Blecky Yuckerella: "Fuc- --u, -ss --le" (Fantagraphics, 2011) 
 Take A Joke: Volume III of the Collected Angry Youth Comix (Fantagraphics, 2011) 
 Angry Youth Comix (Fantagraphics, 2015)  - Complete Collection Hardcover Omnibus of all 14 issues of series.
 A New Low (Fantagraphics, 2017)  - Collection of cartoons featured on Vice News.
 Porn Basket (Fantagraphics, 2021)  - Collection of Sketchbook drawings.
 Barely Human (Fantagraphics, 2022)  - Collection of Instagram drawings.
 Johnny Ryan’s Wet Market #1 (The Mansion Press, 2023)

Television and filmography (partial)
MAD (2012), episodes "I Am Lorax / Modern Family Circus" (additional designer, writer), "Potions 11 / Moves Like Jabba" (additional design)
Pig Goat Banana Cricket (creator, voice actor, co-executive producer)
The Curse of the Monkeybird (2019) (writer)
JJ Villard's Fairy Tales (2020) (writer, creative consultant)
Looney Tunes Cartoons (writer)
Funny Pages (Art department)

Notes

References
The Comics Journal #279 (Nov. 2006)

External links
Review of Prison Pit Book One at The Faster Times

1970 births
Living people
American comics writers
American animators
Underground cartoonists
Artists from Boston
Artists from Los Angeles
University of Massachusetts Amherst alumni
Showrunners